The Ministry Years is a two-volume posthumous compilation album series by the American contemporary Christian music pianist and singer Keith Green, originally released in 1987 and 1988. Each two-disc volume covers half of Green's recording career: 1977–1979 and 1980–1982. Included with each volume is a 19-page booklet insert. These compilation albums include several previously unreleased songs (denoted by a ** below). Both volumes were re-released in 1999 with new covers patterned after the Songs of... series. The re-issue also includes a digital copy of the book No Compromise: The Life Story of Keith Green.

Track listings 
Volume One: 1977–1979

Volume Two: 1980–1982

Notes

References

Compilation album series
Keith Green albums
1987 compilation albums
1988 compilation albums
Compilation albums published posthumously